Elizabeth Street is a neighborhood in southwestern Lexington, Kentucky, United States. Its boundaries are Dantzler Drive to the south, Norfolk Southern railroad tracks to the west, South Limestone Street to the east, and Waller Avenue to the north.

Neighborhood statistics
 Area: 
 Population: 794
 Population density: 6,357 people per square mile
 Median household income: $44,328

External links
 http://www.city-data.com/neighborhood/Elizabeth-Street-Lexington-KY.html

Neighborhoods in Lexington, Kentucky